Thomas Percival Syminton (May 1904 – 7 April 1987) was a cricketer who played six First-class cricket matches for Rhodesia between 1929 and 1931.

He was educated at Ardingly College. He died in Western Australia in 1987.

References

1904 births
1987 deaths
People educated at Ardingly College
Rhodesia cricketers
Rhodesian emigrants to Australia